Loxothysanus is a genus of Mexican flowering plants in the daisy family.

 Species
 Loxothysanus pedunculatus Rydb. - San Luis Potosi, Hidalgo
 Loxothysanus sinuatus (Less.) B.L.Rob. - Chiapas, Veracruz, San Luis Potosi, Oaxaca, Hidalgo, Puebla, Tamaulipas

References

Bahieae
Asteraceae genera
Endemic flora of Mexico